The 41st Venice Biennale, held in 1984, was an exhibition of international contemporary art, with 33 participating nations. The Venice Biennale takes place biennially in Venice, Italy. No prizes were awarded this year or in any Biennale between 1968 and 1986.

References

Bibliography

Further reading 

 
 
 
 
 
 
 
 
 
 
 
 
 
 
 

1984 in art
1984 in Italy
Venice Biennale exhibitions